The Ironton Tribune is  a daily newspaper based in Ironton, Ohio. The newspaper is owned by Boone Newspapers.

The Tribune originated in 1928 as a merger of existing publications The Irontonian and The Ironton Register. The Register had been in circulation since 1850, while The Irontonian entered circulation in 1874. Originally based at Railroad Street in downtown Ironton, the Tribune relocated to its current location on Fifth Street in 1974.

Podcaster, comedian, and video game journalist Justin McElroy worked as a reporter for the Ironton Tribune from 2005, later being promoted to news editor before entering the video game journalism industry with Joystiq in 2007.

References

Newspapers published in Ohio
Ironton, Ohio
1928 establishments in Ohio